The 2022 Nebraska Attorney General election was held on November 8, 2022, to elect the next attorney general of Nebraska. Incumbent Republican Attorney General Doug Peterson was eligible to run for a third term, but he announced on December 14, 2021 that he would not run for re-election.

No Democratic candidates filed to run for the position, and Hilgers faced Legal Marijuana Now candidate, former Republican congressional candidate Larry Bolinger, in the general election.

Republican primary

Candidates

Nominee
Mike Hilgers, Speaker of the Nebraska Legislature

Eliminated in primary
Jennifer Hicks, conservative activist

Declined
Doug Peterson, incumbent attorney general

Endorsements

Results

Legal Marijuana Now primary

Candidates

Declared

Results

General election

Predictions

Endorsements

Results

See also 
 2022 Nebraska elections

References

External links 
Official campaign sites
Larry Bolinger (LMN) for Attorney General
Mike Hilgers (R) for Attorney General

Attorney General
Nebraska
Nebraska Attorney General elections